The Commonwealth Aircraft CA-28 Ceres was a crop-duster aircraft manufactured in Australia by the Commonwealth Aircraft Corporation (CAC) between 1959 and 1963. The aircraft was a development of the Wirraway trainer of World War II.

Development
In the 1950s, most crop-dusting aircraft in Australia were conversions of military types that met with varying success. Two CAC types so converted were the Wackett and the Wirraway. Neither type was successful as a crop duster, the Wackett because it was underpowered and the Wirraway because it was not designed for low-level slow-speed flight. Following a market survey conducted together with ICI, CAC determined there was a need for a purpose-built aircraft optimized for agricultural work. Once the board approved the project, a number of surplus Wirraways were purchased from the RAAF for use in the production of this new aircraft.

The design that emerged, although superficially similar to the Wirraway, was really a new type that used some Wirraway components, rather than a conversion. The only major components used in both types without alteration were the tail group and the landing gear. The fuselage was completely new, with a  hopper installed between the engine and the high-mounted single-seat cockpit. The Wirraway wing was substantially altered for use in the Ceres. The outer wing panels had slotted trailing-edge flaps and fixed leading edge slats, while the centre-section was substantially altered to accommodate the hopper, the greater weight of the Ceres, the different flaps (the Wirraway had split flaps,) and the new type's fixed landing gear with CAC Mustang main wheels, as opposed to the Wirraway's retractable gear, although the same landing gear legs were used however. The increase in wingspan and wing area of the Ceres compared to the Wirraway was also incorporated in the centre section, and the result was an aircraft with much more docile stalling characteristics than those of the Wirraway. The engine was the same, a Pratt & Whitney R-1340, but altered so that it was direct drive rather than geared as on the Wirraway. The three-bladed variable-pitch propeller was also different, having a wider chord and smaller diameter compared to the Wirraway, to suit the Ceres different operating regime and the direct-drive engine.

The Ceres prototype first flew in February 1958, in the hands of CAC test pilot Bill Scott, and the first production aircraft was delivered in April 1959. After five aircraft had been built, provision was made for a rear-facing seat behind the cockpit, housed under an extended canopy, which was the only major design change during production. The CAC hoped to sell at least fifty aircraft, but production of the Ceres ended in July 1963 after 21 aircraft had been built, although one could be more accurately described as a rebuild, because it was manufactured using parts salvaged from the first aircraft, which had crashed in 1961. The Ceres succumbed to the popularity of more modern and economical designs such as the Piper Pawnee and PAC Fletcher.

Ceres aircraft survive in small numbers, with two still registered to fly in Australia, and examples in museums in Australia and New Zealand, the latter being a survivor of the six Ceres exported to that country. Recently, with the popularity of the Wirraway as a warbird, and the scarcity of Wirraway components, Ceres wings have been "de-converted" for use in Wirraway restorations. However, because of the substantial differences between the two types, that has proved to be troublesome.

Specifications

See also

References

Further reading
 

 

Ceres
1950s Australian agricultural aircraft
Single-engined tractor aircraft
Low-wing aircraft
Aircraft first flown in 1958